Brehov is a village and municipality in the Trebišov District in the Košice Region of eastern Slovakia.

History
In historical records the village was first mentioned in 1309. A convent of Franciscans friars was founded in 1752.

Geography
The village lies at an altitude of 130 metres and covers an area of 7.901 km².
It has a population of about 640 people.

Ethnicity
The village is approximately 45% Hungarian and 55% Slovak.

Facilities
The village has a public library and a football pitch.

Genealogical resources

The records for genealogical research are available at the state archive "Statny Archiv in Kosice, Slovakia"

 Roman Catholic church records (births/marriages/deaths): 1752–1902 (parish A)
 Greek Catholic church records (births/marriages/deaths): 1772–1895 (parish B)
 Reformated church records (births/marriages/deaths): 1816–1895 (parish B)

See also
 List of municipalities and towns in Slovakia

External links
https://web.archive.org/web/20070513023228/http://www.statistics.sk/mosmis/eng/run.html
 Convent of Franciscans friars in Brehov
Surnames of living people in Brehov

Villages and municipalities in Trebišov District
Zemplín (region)